Vernon Emmry Aldo Rumsey (January 24, 1973 – August 6, 2020) was an American musician. He is best known for his work as the bassist of the noise rock band Unwound, in which he was a co-founding member; he was also responsible for writing the band's lyrics. He was also in the bands Long Hind Legs, Oslo, Fitz of Depression, and Witchypoo, and (in 2009) was playing in the band Flora v. Fauna.

He generally played a Fender Jazz bass. He was also a recording engineer who has worked with bands such as Blonde Redhead, KARP, Enemymine, Novex and Replicator.

Rumsey played bass guitar on the Blonde Redhead record Fake Can Be Just as Good, and co-ran the label Punk in My Vitamins, with his bandmates Justin Trosper and Sara Lund.

He has been variously credited as Doombuggy, Red Rumsey, RedRumsey, Rumsey, Vern and Vernon Rumsey.

On May 1, 2020, it was revealed that Vern Rumsey was a member of a recording project/band called Household Gods, also consisting of David Pajo of Slint, Conan Neutron of Conan Neutron & the Secret Friends and Replicator, and Lauren K. Newman (LKN) of Palo Verde and LKN Band. The record, Palace Intrigue, was recorded at Rancho De La Luna in Joshua Tree, California, and was produced by Dave Catching. The first single,  "Rest in Power", was released on the same date. A second song, "Shine Theory", premiered on May 28, 2020 on The Big Takeover. before the whole record was released on June 12, 2020.

Rumsey died on August 6, 2020; he was 47. His death sparked an outpouring of support and testimonials amongst many music communities.

References

External links
 

1973 births
2020 deaths
American bass guitarists
Place of death missing
Place of birth missing